Japan national field hockey team may refer to:

 Japan men's national field hockey team
 Japan women's national field hockey team